For list of Roman Catholic churches in the Archdiocese of Los Angeles, see:

Our Lady of the Angels, for central and West Los Angeles
San Fernando, covering the San Fernando, Santa Clarita and Antelope Valleys. 
San Gabriel, for East Los Angeles the San Gabriel Valley and the Pomona Valley.  
San Pedro, for Long Beach and southern Los Angeles County. 
Santa Barbara, for Santa Barbara and Ventura Counties.

Lists of churches in the United States by diocese